Ghost Cat (also known as Mrs. Ashboro's Cat and The Cat That Came Back) is a 2004 Canadian supernatural drama television film starring Elliot Page and Nigel Bennett. It was directed by Don McBrearty and written by Larry Ketron. The film is based on the novel by Beverly Butler. The film is rated PG for "mild thematic elements and some peril".

Plot 
A widower (Ontkean) and his teen daughter (Page) move into a house that was once owned by the friendly Mrs. Ashboro and her pet cat, Margaret. Strange things begin happening, and it soon becomes clear that the ghost of Mrs. Ashboro's cat Margaret, who died on the same day as its owner, is haunting the house.

Cast

Reception 
At the time of its airing, critic Gail Pennington wrote, "Ghost Cat is no Mystic River, but it's sweet and suitable for the whole family."

Awards
Elliot Page won the Gemini Award for Best Performance in a Children's or Youth Program or Series for his role.

References

External links
 
 
 
 Veegesource.com: Mention of film
 Goliath.eecnext.com: Film review
 TVguide.com: Spoiler
 Variety.com: Ghost Cat
 InBaseline.com: Ghost Cat
 Library.Zipazat.com: Ghost Cat

2003 television films
Canadian horror television films
2003 horror films
2003 films
English-language Canadian films
Films about cats
2000s English-language films
Films directed by Don McBrearty
2000s Canadian films